Bilekahalli is a suburb in Bangalore, India, situated off Bannerghatta Road. It has gained prominence in recent times due to a boom in real estate and profusion of Information technology companies. Several prominent hospitals as well as residential complexes have been set up in this area.

Bilekahalli is also home to the Indian Institute of Management Bangalore, one of India's premier management institutes.

Hospitals in Bilekahalli 
 Fortis Hospital (formerly Wockhardt Hospital)
 Apollo Hospital
 Parimala Hospital.
 Ashwini Hospital.
 Government Primary Health and Maternity Center (Arekere).
 Vivekanand Hospital (Dr Manikantan C.K.)
 Jeevottama Health Multi specialty Ayurveda Hospital (Dr Sharad Kulkarni)
 Rajashree Granthi Hospital (Dr Harish Babu and Shilpa Harish)
 Raibow Children's Hospital
 Shekhar Netralaya
 Narayana Netralaya
 Shreya Medical Center Hospital (BTS Layout)
 Nano Hospital
 Kshema diagnostic centre

Transportation 

Bilekahalli is well connected to Bangalore by BMTC old buses. Most of them stop at sri veerabhadra swamy bus stop which is also the main landmark. Many auto walas stay in this area so getting auto during early morning and late night is not a problem. Very narrow roads. Ola and Uber also provide service in Bilekahalli.

See also  
 Omashram

References

Neighbourhoods in Bangalore